

This is a list of the National Register of Historic Places listings in Dayton, Ohio.

Current listings

|}

Former listings

|}

See also

 List of National Historic Landmarks in Ohio
 National Register of Historic Places listings in Ohio

References

External links
Historic districts in Dayton

 Dayton
History of Dayton, Ohio
Dayton, Ohio-related lists
Buildings and structures in Dayton, Ohio